The United Romania Party was a Romanian nationalist political party. It was founded by former members of the Social Democratic Party (PSD), such as Bogdan Diaconu and Greater Romania Party (PRM), like Horațiu Șerb, Vasile Vlasin and Valerian Moraru. The founding members, signatories of the party registration, are: Bogdan Diaconu, Daniel Hogea, Augustin-Florin Hagiu, Horațiu Șerb, Dumitru Badragan, and Dragoș Stancu, based on the civil decision nr. 5 from 7 February 2017, definitive on 25 April 2015.

The party claims to adhere to a "national-democratic" doctrine based on the ideas of Romanian historian and politician Nicolae Iorga and centered on principles of social justice, economic protectionism, Romanian nationalism and anticorruption. According to a resolution adopted in September 2015, it opposes migrant quotas, same-sex marriage, adoption of the euro, Transatlantic Trade and Investment Partnership (TTIP), among others. The party's adversaries consider that it wears a mimetic nationalist stance, former 'PSD-ists and clerks of Voicescu were not and will never be nationalists'. Prominent members (ex. vicepresident Ovidiu Hurduzeu) of the party support the "immediate Romanian withdrawal from the EU and NATO" publishing messages such as 'The Ceaușescu times were better!' on websites. In the 2016 Romanian legislative election, the party received 207,608 votes in the Senate election, and 196,602 in the election to the Chamber of Deputies, not achieving the parliamentary status.

Self-characterization
The United Romania Party characterizes itself as follows:

Party criticism
In July 2016, Daniel Ghiță, kickboxing world champion, left the party, disagreeing with the party president at the time, Bogdan Diaconu, stating that he does not follow the principles he promotes.

Electoral history

Legislative elections

European elections

References

2015 establishments in Romania
National conservative parties
Nationalist parties in Romania
Registered political parties in Romania
Political parties established in 2015
Protectionism
Eurosceptic parties in Romania
Conservative parties in Romania
Romanian nationalist parties
Right-wing populist parties
Political parties with anti-Hungarian sentiment
Right-wing parties in Romania
2019 disestablishments in Romania
Political parties disestablished in 2019
Defunct political parties in Romania
Defunct conservative parties
Defunct nationalist parties